Scott Edward Adkins (born 17 June 1976) is a British actor, film producer and martial artist. He is best known for his role as the Russian prison fighter Yuri Boyka in the Undisputed franchise. He has played Yuri Boyka in the (2006) film Undisputed II: Last Man Standing and its two sequels, Undisputed III: Redemption (2010) and Boyka: Undisputed (2017); Casey Bowman in the (2009) film Ninja and its (2013) sequel Ninja: Shadow of a Tear; French in the (2018) film The Debt Collector and its (2020) sequel Debt Collectors (starring alongside Louis Mandylor).

He worked in four films with his idol Jean-Claude Van Damme: The Shepherd: Border Patrol, Assassination Games, Universal Soldier: Day of Reckoning and The Expendables 2. He also had starring roles in The Legend of Hercules, Wolf Warrior and Ip Man 4: The Finale playing the main antagonist in all three films, and also appeared in The Bourne Ultimatum, Zero Dark Thirty, and the Marvel projects Mutant X, X-Men Origins: Wolverine, and Doctor Strange. In 2022, he starred in Day Shift with Jamie Foxx and Dave Franco, and in John Wick: Chapter 4 alongside Keanu Reeves in 2023.

Early life
Scott Edward Adkins was born in Sutton Coldfield, a town within Birmingham, England on 17 June 1976 into a family of butchers. He first became interested in martial arts at the age of ten, when he visited a local Judo club with his father and older brother. After being robbed at age 13, his interest in martial arts grew even more. That same year, he began to practise Taekwondo. Since the age of 16, Scott also started to practise Kickboxing with Anthony Jones, eventually becoming a kickboxing instructor for the Professional Karate Association. He ran classes at the Fitness First at Bearwood, Smethwick once a week. He has also gained experience in  Ninjutsu, Krav Maga, Karate, Wushu, Aikido, Jujutsu, MMA, Capoeira and Gymnastics.

Career
His first break came when he was offered a role in a Hong Kong martial arts film called Dei Seung Chui Keung (2001) (aka Extreme Challenge). He was spotted by Head of the Hong Kong Stuntmen Association and director Wei Tung and British-born Hong Kong movie expert Bey Logan, and found himself in the East for the first time. He had the opportunity to work with some of Hong Kong cinema's leading action directors including Yuen Woo-ping, Corey Yuen, Sammo Hung and Jackie Chan. Acting roles soon started to come in and he was offered a guest role in the BBC's Doctors (2000) filmed at Birmingham's Pebble Mill. He appeared in a few episodes in BBC's EastEnders (2003) and City Central (1999), and a lead role in Sky One comedy drama Mile High (2003) followed by a regular role in BBC's Holby City (2006) as Bradley Hume, the assistant general manager of Holby General.

Starring roles in feature films soon followed with his portrayal of Talbot in Special Forces (2003) and Yuri Boyka in Undisputed II: Last Man Standing (2006). It was this film that broke him into the mainstream with his villainous portrayal of the Russian MMA underground fighter Boyka. After this Scott had guest starring roles in bigger budget films like The Bourne Ultimatum (2007) and The Tournament (2009), and played Jean-Claude Van Damme's main adversary in Sony Pictures The Shepherd: Border Patrol (2008). He shared the role of Weapon XI with Ryan Reynolds in X-Men Origins: Wolverine (2009). Adkins appears in the role of King Amphitryon in The Legend of Hercules.

In 2012, he was cast to star in Métal Hurlant Chronicles, a television adaptation of the popular French comic book Metal Hurlant.

Adkins was reunited with action choreographer Yuen Woo-ping in 2019 when he starred alongside Donnie Yen in Ip Man 4: The Finale as the main antagonist Barton Geddes, a Marine gunnery sergeant. According to Adkins, Yen personally requested him to star in the film.In 2022, he starred in Day Shift with Jamie Foxx and Dave Franco, and will appear in John Wick: Chapter 4 alongside Keanu Reeves in 2023.

Filmography

Film

Television

Awards and nominations

References

External links

1976 births
20th-century English male actors
21st-century English male actors
British stunt performers
English male film actors
English male soap opera actors
English male taekwondo practitioners
English people of Spanish descent
English jujutsuka
English expatriates in the United States
Krav Maga practitioners
Living people
Male actors from Birmingham, West Midlands
People educated at Bishop Vesey's Grammar School
People from Sutton Coldfield